El Norte is a daily newspaper printed and distributed in Monterrey, Nuevo León, Mexico.

History 

During the decades of the 1970s, 1980s and 1990s, El Norte gained important successes in exposing corruption in government. Due to its principles of independent journalism, the federal government cut the paper supply required  to print the newspaper, so the company had to import it directly. At the end El Norte won the battle against the then government monopoly import of paper for printing (PIPSA).
Grupo Reforma is 85 years old. It began with the founding of the newspaper El Sol in April 1922, followed by El Norte in 1938, the newspaper Metro in Monterrey in 1988 (and renovated in 1993). Four years later, in 1997, the newspaper Palabra was born in Saltillo, and the Metro in Mexico City. Mural, in Guadalajara, was founded a year later. In 2004 and 2005, Metro expanded to Saltillo and Guadalajara. In 2007 and 2008, Metro again expanded to State of Mexico and Puebla.
La Reforma, a branch of El Norte, was founded in 1993 in Mexico City.

2012 attacks 
On 10 July 2012, gunmen threw grenades into two buildings belonging to the paper. On 30 July, the El Norte headquarters in Monterrey was attacked by three masked men who subdued the security guard and set fire to the building's lobby. Two carried automatic weapons. A police car arrived on the scene, but did not attempt to apprehend the suspects. The attack was the third in one month against the newspaper, leading to speculation that the attack was retaliation by drug traffickers for El Norte's coverage of organized crime.

Notable columnists 
 Armando Fuentes Aguirre (Catón), writer and political analyst
 Carmen Aristegui, a political journalist
 Rosaura Barahona, teacher, essayist
 Carlos Fuentes, writer, essayist
 Carlos Monsiváis, writer, essayist, journalist
 Denise Dresser, a political analyst
 Enrique Krauze, historian
 Everardo Elizondo, an economist
 Gabriel Zaid, writer, poet, engineer
 Germain Dehesa, writer and political commentator
 Homero Aridjis, poet, environmentalist
 Jorge Castañeda, intellectual, academic, former Foreign Secretary
 José Woldenberg, political analyst, former President of IFE
 John Villoro, writer
 Lorenzo Meyer, historian and political analyst
 Miguel Ángel Granados Chapa, intellectual, political analyst
 Mario Vargas Llosa, writer, essayist
 Paco Calderón, political cartoonist
 Sergio Aguayo Quezada, a political analyst
 Matt Sanchez, a political analyst
 Alan Rivera, journalist, political analyst, news producer, TV talent
 Lucrecia Lozano political analyst, academic
 Roberto Javier Mora García, assassinated crime reporter

Regular sections 
 Internacional (International News)
 Nacional (National News)
 Local (Local News)
 Seguridad (Public Safety and Criminal News)
 Negocios (Business News)
 Gente (Entertainment News)
 Vida! (Miscellaneous News)
 Mexico City (online version)

Supplemental sections 
 Automotriz (Automobile News)
 Interface (Electronics and Gadgets News)
 De Viaje (Traveling News)
 Top Magazzine (Entertainment and Gossip News)
 Universidades (College Information News)

Social supplements 
This supplements are only given to subscriptors who live in that neighborhood or that school. E.G. The Anahuac section is only sold to subscriptors living in the Colonia Anahuac neighborhood.

 Sierra Madre
 SM Joven
 SM JR
 La Silla
 Cumbres
 Cumbres Joven
 Anáhuac
 Linda Vista
 Fototienda
 ClubTEC
 ClubUNI

See also 
 List of newspapers in Mexico

References

External links 
 Official Page (In Spanish)
 Facebook page

Newspapers published in Mexico
Spanish-language newspapers
Mass media in Monterrey